Al Misri was an Arabic newspaper which was published in Cairo, Egypt, between 1936 and 1954. The paper was one of the most read newspapers during its lifetime and closed down by the Egyptian authorities on 4 May 1954.

History and profile
Al Misri was established by Karim Thabit, Muhammad Al Tabai and Mahmoud Abu Al Fath in 1936. Elie Politi, a leading Jewish businessman, also assisted the foundation of the paper. Soon after its start Mahmoud Abu Al Fath bought the paper for a few thousand dollars and made it an official media outlet of the Wafd Party. Mahmoud Abu Al Fath's younger siblings worked at the paper: Hussein Abu Al Fath was the managing editor, and Ahmad Abu Al Fath was the editor of Al Misri.  

Following the acquisition of the paper by Mahmoud Abu Al Fath Al Misri sold 100,000 copies, making it both a financial success and an influential political force. It also became a competitor of Al Ahram. In July 1939 the editors' houses were searched on the orders of the public prosecutor due to the fierce opposition of the Waft Party against the government. During the same period Al Misri was among the ardent critics of the Muslim Brotherhood which began to gain more members in the society.

Beginning with World War II the Egyptian government restricted the page number of all papers, including Al Misri, to six pages due to the shortage of paper. Although the war ended and the paper supply was improved, the page number of the newspapers was set at eight pages by the government. As of 1950 Al Misri had twelve-page. The affiliation of Al Misri with the Wafd Party weakened after World War II. However, it did not completely disappear, and the paper published numerous articles supporting the North African independence in line with the party policies in 1947.

In May 1954 the Fath brothers were accused of being disloyal to the national interests following the publication of several articles  in Al Misri demanding Gamal Abdel Nasser to follow the policies of the Wafd Party. The paper was banned on 4 May 1954. Soon after the closure of Al Misri its publishing facilities were used for the publication of the state-run newspaper Al Gomhuria which was launched the same year.

References
 

1936 establishments in Egypt
1954 disestablishments in Egypt
Arabic-language newspapers
Banned newspapers
Censorship in Egypt
Defunct newspapers published in Egypt
Newspapers established in 1936
Newspapers published in Cairo
Publications disestablished in 1954